Harold Elliott may refer to:
H. A. Elliott (Harold A. Elliott, 1890–1939), American lawyer and attorney from Arizona
Hal Elliott (Harold William Elliott, 1899–1963), American baseball player
Harold Elliott (American football) ("Bud" Elliott, 1931–2005), American football coach
Harold Edward Elliott ("Pompey" Elliott, 1878–1931), Australian Major General and politician 
Harold Elliott (artist) (1890–1968), Canadian painter
Rowdy Elliott (Harold Bell Elliott, 1890–1934), American baseball player
Harold Elliott (cricketer) (1904–1969), English cricketer

See also
Harry Elliott (disambiguation)